Kemah may refer to:

 Kemah, Erzincan, a town and district of Erzincan Province, Turkey
 Kemah, Texas, a city in Galveston County, Texas, United States
 USS Kemah, a United States Navy patrol vessel in commission from 1918 to 1919
 Kemah Bob, an American comedian